Yohana Susana Yembise (born 1 October 1958) is an Indonesian academician and politician who served as Indonesia's Minister of Women's Empowerment and Child Protection in Joko Widodo's Working Cabinet.

Biography

Early life and education
Yembise was born in the city of Manokwari, then part of Netherlands New Guinea, on 1 October 1958. The second child of eleven siblings, Yembise's father was a civil servant for Nabire Regency. Yembise was first educated in Jayapura and later studied in public high schools in Nabire, and was involved in a student exchange to Canada as a senior high schooler.

After completing high school, Yembise went to Cenderawasih University and studied English education, earning her bachelor's degree in 1985. She later went to Singapore and earned a diploma from the Southeast Asian Ministers of Education Organization - Regional English Language Center (SEAMEO RELC). Further on, she studied at Canada's Simon Fraser University for her education masters, graduating in 1994 and later a PhD from Australia's University of Newcastle in 2007.

Academic career
She became a lecturer at Cenderawasih University's faculty of education. She was awarded a doctoral professorship in syllabus design and material development as the first female Papuan to become a professor in Indonesia on November 2012.

In 2011, she was selected as a member of a committee awarding the Australian Development Scholarship for Indonesia. Yembise noted that her team at Cenderawasih was "mapping out the number of highly educated women in Papua and designing positions for them".

Politics and ministry
Yembise ran as the regent of Biak Numfor Regency in 2013 as an independent candidate, but was unsuccessful. In an interview, Yembise remarked that many voters liked her but had already committed to candidates who provided funds for construction of houses of worship and others, and added that she was "failed by money".

On 26 October 2014, newly elected president Joko Widodo appointed and swore in Yembise as the Minister of Women's Empowerment and Child Protection, replacing Linda Amalia Sari. Yembise became the first female minister originating from Papua in the Indonesian government.

Yembise dubbed her program "Three Ends" - which included ending domestic violence and human trafficking in addition to ending inequality of economic access to women.

Personal life
Yembise is married to Leo Danuwira. The couple has three children, including two daughters who studied abroad. She is a Christian.

References

1958 births
People from Manokwari
Living people
Women government ministers of Indonesia
Working Cabinet (Joko Widodo)
University of Newcastle (Australia) alumni
Simon Fraser University alumni
Cenderawasih University alumni
Indonesian Christians
Papuan people
21st-century Indonesian women politicians
21st-century Indonesian politicians